Pygmipanda atomata, known as the dwarf panda snail is a species of air-breathing land snail, a terrestrial pulmonate gastropod mollusc in the family Caryodidae.

References

Caryodidae
Gastropods described in 1834
Taxa named by John Edward Gray